Geoffrey Adam Starks is an American lawyer serving as a Commissioner of the United States Federal Communications Commission (FCC). He was nominated by President Trump to succeed Mignon Clyburn who announced on April 19, 2018, that she was going to step down on June 6, 2018. Starks was unanimously confirmed by the United States Senate on January 2, 2019. He was sworn into office on January 30, 2019. Starks is affiliated with the Democratic Party. His term was to end July 1, 2022.

Early life and education 
Starks is a native of and was born in Kansas City, Missouri and raised in Kansas. He earned a B.A, degree from Harvard College and a Juris Doctor from Yale Law School.

Career 
Prior to Stark's entry into federal public service, he was an attorney at the law firm Williams & Connolly, clerked for the Honorable Judge Duane Benton on the United States Court of Appeals for the Eighth Circuit, served as a legislative staffer in the Illinois State Senate, and worked as a financial analyst. Thereafter, he was Senior Counsel in the Office of the Deputy Attorney General at the U.S. Department of Justice (DOJ) where he provided advice on domestic and international law enforcement issues, including civil, criminal, and national security matters. At DOJ, he received the Attorney General Award for Exceptional Service. Starks continued his career as Assistant Bureau Chief in the FCC's Enforcement Bureau, where he focused on protecting consumers, promoting network security, and preserving the integrity of the Commission's Universal Service Fund programs.

In June 2018, President Trump nominated Geoffrey Starks to fill a Democratic seat on the FCC. He was confirmed by the Senate in January 2019.

Personal life 
Starks lives in Washington, D.C. with his wife, Lauren and their two children.

References

Living people
21st-century American lawyers
Harvard College alumni
Members of the Federal Communications Commission
Yale Law School alumni
Year of birth missing (living people)
Lawyers from Kansas City, Missouri
Kansas lawyers